Ade Laoye is a Nigerian-American actress. She is a graduate of Pennsylvania State University where she studied Theatre Arts.

Ade Laoye first starred in Knocking on Heaven's Door  by Emem Isong. Ade also featured in Lunchtime Heroes by Seyi Babatope and in an Africa Magic series, Hush by Oye Agunbiade. Ade Laoye alongside other Nollywood actresses, Kehinde Bankole, Munachi Abii, and Omowumi Dada, have been unveiled as the lead actors in the screen adaptation of Tunde Leye's blog series, Finding Hubby.

Ade Laoye was nominated for a Barrymore Award for Best Ensemble in a Musical she performed in The Arden Theatre Company.

Filmography
 A Naija Christmas (2021)
 Collision Course (2021 film) (2021)
Finding Hubby (2020)
Lizard (2020)
A second Husband (2020)
Walking with Shadows (2019)
Oga John (2019)
Knockout Blessing (2018)
Castle & Castle (2018)
You Me Maybe (2017)
Hush (2016)
Erased (2015)
Lunch Time (2015)
Dowry (2014)

References

External links
 

Living people
Pennsylvania State University alumni
Nigerian stage actresses
Year of birth missing (living people)
Nigerian television actresses
Nigerian film actresses